Thuzio is a sports media and events company that produces a weekly, live-sports interview show for a members-only audience.

History

Thuzio was founded in 2012 by Tiki Barber (New York Giants), Mark Gerson (GLG), and Jared Augustine (GrubHub/Seamless).

Thuzio's Board of Advisors includes Matthew Higgins, CEO of RSE Ventures; Michael Weisman, Emmy Award-winning producer and executive in charge of production for “Football Night in America”; Thomas J. Laffont, Senior Analyst at Coatue Management and Partner at Coatue Management; Jordan Bazant, principal at The Legacy Agency; Casey Coffman, advisor at Carpere Group; Billy Nash, senior vice president at UBS; Jason Freier, chairman and CEO of Hardball Capital.

Thuzio received $1.5 million in venture capital in July 2012. RSE Ventures invested $2.56 million in January 2013. In 2014, the company raised another $6 million in Series A funding.

On November 22, 2021, Thuzio was acquired by TrillerNet.

References

Mass media companies established in 2012